Récord is a Mexican daily sports newspaper. It follows a similar format as the Spanish newspaper Marca. Récord is owned by Notmusa.

See also
 List of newspapers in Mexico

References

External links
 Récord

Spanish-language newspapers
Newspapers published in Mexico
Sports mass media in Mexico
Sports newspapers
Publications with year of establishment missing